Norah Elam, also known as Norah Dacre Fox (née Norah Doherty, 1878–1961), was a militant suffragette, anti-vivisectionist, feminist and fascist in the United Kingdom. Born at 13 Waltham Terrace in Dublin to John Doherty, a partner in a paper mills, and Charlotte Isabel Clarke, she moved to England with her family and by 1891 was living in London.  Norah married Charles Richard Dacre Fox in 1909.

Political activity
Norah was a prominent member of the Women's Social and Political Union and served as general secretary. From May to July 1914 she was imprisoned three times in Holloway Prison for "acts of terrorism"; she received a WSPU Hunger Strike Medal with three bars.

In 1918 she stood as an independent candidate in Richmond (Surrey) for election to the Parliament of the United Kingdom but was not elected. The same year she campaigned for the internment of enemy aliens in collaboration with the British Empire Union and the National Party. Norah Elam stated publicly in The Times that she was never a member of the Women's Freedom League (contrary to some reports).

Elam claimed to be a founding member of the London and Provincial Anti-Vivisection Society (LPAVS). Documentary evidence of this has not been found, but it is known that she was a member from about the time of its inception circa 1900.  In the 1930s she had published under the auspices of the LPAVS two pamphlets: "The MRC: What it is and How it Works" and "The Vitamin Survey".  The pamphlets were widely distributed throughout the UK, including public libraries.

By the 1930s, she had separated from her husband, and was living with Edward Descou Dudley Vallance Elam whose surname she adopted. They lived in Sussex where they were active in the local Conservative Party, however they defected to Oswald Mosley's British Union of Fascists (BUF) soon after its creation in 1932 and she became prominent in the women's section. During this time, she encountered Wilfred Risdon, Director of Propaganda 1933–4, who was later a colleague in the LPAVS. She was a frequent contributor to the fascist press and in 1937 was put forward as a candidate for the BUF for the Northampton constituency, but, because of the war, the election never took place. Mosley used her suffragette past to counter the criticism that National Socialism was anti-feminist saying that her prospective candidacy "killed for all time the suggestion that National Socialism proposed putting British women back in the home". In 1940 Norah and Dudley Elam were arrested as Defence Regulation 18B detainees and she was interned in Holloway Prison with several other female fascists including Diana Mosley.

Family
Elam had one son, Evelyn (born 1922). Her granddaughter, Angela McPherson, described in a BBC documentary that she had no idea until 2002 of the role Elam played at the centre of the fascist movement. Angela knew that Elam had been a suffragette who claimed to have been close to the Pankhursts; a sudden decision to search online for information about Norah Elam started to throw up information she had not been aware of.  Angela felt that she had subconsciously blocked out disturbing memories of the stories her grandmother told her as a child, which were to affect her family. She described Elam as a "dreadful racist". They feel that she emotionally damaged her son, turning him into a "bullying misogynist" imitation of Norah's own father. A biography, Mosley's Old Suffragette, has been written by Susan McPherson and Angela McPherson.

References

1878 births
1961 deaths
Anti-vivisectionists
British Union of Fascists politicians
English suffragettes
English women in politics
British feminist writers
British feminists
British women's rights activists
English animal rights activists
Hunger Strike Medal recipients
People detained under Defence Regulation 18B
Politicians from Dublin (city)